Robin Hood Aviation was an Austrian airline, operating from its homebase Graz and from Linz to Zurich. It operated also charter flights. Majority owners were the Austrian entrepreneurs Dr. Helmut Rieder and Dr. Raimund Pammer (founders of Efkon Group).

History 
In 2005 Robin Hood Aviation GmbH was founded by Dr. Helmut Rieder, Dr. Raimund Pammer (both 2/3 owner) and 1/3 owner Georg Pommer 
The airline got its AOC on 11. April 2007 (Air Operators Certificate) and started the first flight in May 2007 from Graz to Zurich with Saab 340A 
In October 2008 the route Graz to Stuttgart was opened
Flights from Linz to Zurich stopped after some months operations
In the summer of 2009 Robin Hood operated also from Klagenfurt (Carinthia) to Zurich 
After financial troubles Robin Hood Aviation went into receivership in March 2010 - it had 24 employees at that time. The airlines was able to continue its activities.
On 23. August 2011 Robin Hood Aviation filed for insolvency and ceased operations the following day.

Destinations 

Austria
Graz - Graz Airport (GRZ)
Linz - Linz Airport (LNZ)
Switzerland
Zürich - Zürich Airport (ZRH)

Former destinations:
Stuttgart - Stuttgart Airport (STR)
Klagenfurt - Klagenfurt Airport (KLU)

Fleet 
As of August 2011 the Robin Hood Aviation fleet consisted of the following aircraft:

2 Saab 340A (OE-GIR, OE-GOD)

References

External links
Official website

Defunct airlines of Austria
Airlines established in 2007
Airlines disestablished in 2011
2011 disestablishments in Austria
Austrian companies established in 2007
Companies based in Graz